Richard J. Zobel Jr. (June 5, 1952 – October 4, 2005) was an American actor. He starred as the attorney Aaron Levinsky in the original Broadway run of Nuts in 1980. Over the course of his career he was also a singer, instrumentalist, animator, writer, and producer.

Career
Zobel was born in West Chester, Pennsylvania, and moved to New York City for his acting career. His Off-Broadway credits included All's Well That Ends Well and The Taming of the Shrew in the New York Shakespeare Festival in Central Park in 1978, and The Country Girl in 1984. He starred as the attorney Aaron Levinsky in the original Broadway run of Nuts in 1980. He appeared in small and supporting film roles, and had guest appearances in over a dozen television series including The X Files, ER, China Beach, Hill Street Blues, and Star Trek: Voyager, from 1984 through 1999. He was also a singer and a musician. He acted and sang in, and was the vocal arranger for, the 1987 film Walker, and the 2008 making-of documentary about the film, Dispatches from Nicaragua, is dedicated to his memory.

He was a commentator in the 2004 documentary The Loss of Nameless Things, about seriously injured playwright Oakley Hall III. Zobel had starred as the title role in Hall's first adaptations of Alfred Jarry's bizarrely comic and revolutionary 1896 French play Ubu Roi (called Ubu Rex) and its sequels, in New York City Off-Off-Broadway and at the Lexington Conservatory Theatre 1976–1977. Zobel also produced the play, and created the masks for it.

In 2000, Zobel co-founded Rubber Chicken Cards, which sells online greeting cards that combine voice-over acting with irreverent humor, with fellow actor Steven Rotblatt. For the cards Zobel sang, played several instruments, wrote scripts, did animation, and voiced numerous characters.

He died in October 2005 of cancer.

Notes

External links

American male stage actors
American male film actors
American male television actors
American male voice actors
People from West Chester, Pennsylvania
1952 births
2005 deaths
20th-century American male actors